Saye is a woollen cloth woven in the west and south of England in and around the 15th and 16th centuries. A suburb of Bristol, England is called Sea Mills, this was originally Saye Mills.

On 21 June 1661 the diary of Samuel Pepys recorded purchasing "green Say ... for curtains in my parler".

In 1541 Cecily Aylmer, the daughter of Richard Aylmer, Mayor of Norwich, leaves Mother Manfold 'my best petticoat and an apron of saye', while Mother Plank gets 'my worst petticoat and my worst apron.'

A related sort of cloth was serica, which was finer, since it also contained silk.

References

External links
 About Bristol Suburbs, Sea Mills, Early History

Woven fabrics